Frankie Ozuna Saenz III (born August 12, 1980) is an American mixed martial artist in the bantamweight division of the Ultimate Fighting Championship. A professional since 2009, he made a name for himself fighting mostly in his native state, where he was King of the Cage Flyweight Champion (135 lb), World Fighting Federation Featherweight Champion and Coalition of Combat Featherweight Champion.

Background
The son of Frank and Debbie Saenz, Frankie is of Mexican descent. Frankie had four younger sisters, of whom one committed suicide in her teens. Frankie grew up in Maryvale, Phoenix playing football from the age of seven onward, picking up wrestling at his wrestling coach father's behest in the middle school. Frankie attended Marcos de Niza High School where he was undefeated state champion wrestler in 1998 and 1999 at 133-pound division receiving All American honors in his senior year. He lettered all four of his high school years in wrestling along with two letterman years in football.

Graduating from high school in 1999 Frankie was about to attend University of Oklahoma, but due to the sister's recent suicide he wasn't ready to leave home state and was recruited to Arizona State. He went on to wrestle two years at Arizona State without much accolades and ended up transferring to University of Northern Colorado. At the time UNC had just transferred from Division II to Division I in wrestling, and after a year of wrestling the college was placed on probation which effectively ended Frankie's collegiate wrestling career. Subsequently, Frankie returned to Arizona and started coaching wrestling at Maryvale high school before beginning to train mixed martial arts in 2008.

Mixed martial arts career
He won WFF Featherweight championship in 2011 at WFF 7, with a TKO win over Michael Parker. Later in the next year, he lost his belt via disqualification to Jeff Fletcher due to an illegal knee to head of grounded opponent.

King of the Cage
After winning the Coalition of Combat Championship in 2012, Saenz signed a four-fight contract with King of the Cage with a clause sign with the UFC after two fights. In his promotional debut, Saenz won KOTC Flyweight (135 lbs) championship, with a submission win over Marvin Garcia. He made his first successful title defense against Tyler Bialecki at KOTC: Boiling Point on September 28, 2013. After the fight, World Series of Fighting tried to sign Saenz, but King of the Cage did not release him because the clause in his contract applied only UFC. Saenz then defended his title for the second time against Marvin Blumer at KOTC: Radar Lock on February 22, 2014.

Ultimate Fighting Championship
After his second title defense on KOTC, Saenz signed with the UFC on August 7, 2014. He was scheduled to make his promotional debut on short notice against another newcomer, Nolan Ticman on August 16, 2014 at UFC Fight Night 47. Saenz won the fight via unanimous decision.

Saenz later was scheduled to face Aljamain Sterling on November 8, 2014 at UFC Fight Night 55, but the fight was scrapped due to Saenz being injured.

On February 22, 2015, Saenz fought Iuri Alcântara at UFC Fight Night 61. As a 7-1 underdog, Saenz defeated the #8 ranked Alcântara via unanimous decision.

Saenz faced Sirwan Kakai on August 8, 2015 at UFC Fight Night 73. He won the fight by split decision.

Saenz next faced Urijah Faber on December 12, 2015 at UFC 194.  He lost the back-and-forth fight by unanimous decision.

Saenz faced Eddie Wineland on July 23, 2016 at UFC on Fox 20. He lost the fight via TKO at the 1:54 mark of the third round.

Saenz next faced Augusto Mendes on January 15, 2017 at UFC Fight Night 103. He lost the fight by split decision. Both participants were awarded Fight of the Night for their performance.

Saenz faced promotional newcomer Merab Dvalishvili at UFC Fight Night: Swanson vs. Ortega on December 9, 2017. He won the fight by split decision.

Saenz faced Henry Briones on May 19, 2018 at UFC Fight Night 129. He won the fight by unanimous decision.

Saenz was expected to face Song Yadong on November 23, 2018 at UFC Fight Night 141. However, it was reported on November 7, 2018 that he pulled out of the event due to injury and he was replaced by newcomer Vince Morales.

Saenz was scheduled to face Marlon Vera on March 2, 2019 at UFC 235. However, Vera pulled out of the fight on February 27 due to illness and the bout was scrapped from the event. The bout was rescheduled to UFC Fight Night 148. Saenz lost the fight via technical knockout in round one.

Saenz faced Jonathan Martinez on August 1, 2020 at UFC Fight Night: Brunson vs. Shahbazyan. At the weigh-ins, Martinez weighed in at 140.5 pounds, four and a half pounds over the bantamweight non-title fight limit. His bout proceeded at a catchweight and he was fined 30 percent of his purse, which went to Saenz. He lost this fight via TKO in the third round.

Personal life
Saenz and his fiancé Lena have a daughter and a son.

Championships and accomplishments

King of the Cage
KOTC Flyweight Championship (One time)
 Two successful title defenses
World Fighting Federation
WFF Featherweight Championship (One time)
Coalition of Combat
COC Featherweight Championship (One time)
 Ultimate Fighting Championship
 Fight of the Night (One time)

Mixed martial arts record

|-
|Loss
|align=center|12–7
|Jonathan Martinez
|TKO (knee and punches)
|UFC Fight Night: Brunson vs. Shahbazyan 
|
|align=center|3
|align=center|0:57
|Las Vegas, Nevada, United States
|
|-
|Loss
|align=center|12–6
|Marlon Vera
|TKO (punches)
|UFC Fight Night: Thompson vs. Pettis 
|
|align=center|1
|align=center|1:25
|Nashville, Tennessee, United States
|
|- 
|Win
|align=center|12–5
|Henry Briones
|Decision (unanimous)
|UFC Fight Night: Maia vs. Usman
|
|align=center|3
|align=center|5:00
|Santiago, Chile
|
|-
|Win
|align=center|11–5
|Merab Dvalishvili
|Decision (split)
|UFC Fight Night: Swanson vs. Ortega 
|
|align=center|3
|align=center|5:00
|Fresno, California, United States
|
|-
|Loss
|align=center|10–5
|Augusto Mendes
|Decision (split)
|UFC Fight Night: Rodríguez vs. Penn
|
|align=center|3
|align=center|5:00
|Phoenix, Arizona, United States
|
|-
|Loss
|align=center|10–4
|Eddie Wineland
|TKO (punches) 
|UFC on Fox: Holm vs. Shevchenko
|
|align=center|3
|align=center|1:54
|Chicago, Illinois, United States
|
|-
|Loss
|align=center|10–3
|Urijah Faber
|Decision (unanimous)
|UFC 194
|
|align=center|3
|align=center|5:00
|Las Vegas, Nevada, United States
|
|-
|-
|Win
|align=center|10–2
|Sirwan Kakai
|Decision (split)
|UFC Fight Night: Teixeira vs. Saint Preux
|
|align=center|3
|align=center|5:00
|Nashville, Tennessee, United States
|
|-
|Win
|align=center|9–2
|Iuri Alcântara
|Decision (unanimous)
|UFC Fight Night: Bigfoot vs. Mir
|
|align=center|3
|align=center|5:00
|Porto Alegre, Brazil
|
|-
|Win
|align=center|8–2
|Nolan Ticman
|Decision (unanimous)
|UFC Fight Night: Bader vs. St. Preux
|
|align=center|3
|align=center|5:00
|Bangor, Maine, United States
|
|-
|Win
|align=center|7–2
|Marvin Blumer
|TKO (doctor stoppage)
|KOTC: Radar Lock
|
|align=center|4
|align=center|5:00
|Scottsdale, Arizona, United States
|
|-
|Win
|align=center|6–2
|Tyler Bialecki
|Submission (rear-naked choke)
|KOTC: Boiling Point
|
|align=center|1
|align=center|4:53
|Scottsdale, Arizona, United States
|
|-
|Win
|align=center|5–2
|Marvin Garcia
|Submission (rear-naked choke)
|KOTC: World Champions
|
|align=center|2
|align=center|4:10
|Las Vegas, Nevada, United States
|
|-
|Win
|align=center|4–2
|Jade Porter
|Decision (majority)
|Coalition of Combat: Pound for Pound
|
|align=center|3
|align=center|5:00
|Phoenix, Arizona, United States
|
|-
|Loss
|align=center|3–2
|Jeff Fletcher
|DQ (illegal knee)
| World Fighting Federation 8
|
|align=center|1
|align=center|4:12
|Scottsdale, Arizona, United States
|
|-
|Loss
|align=center|3–1
|Cody Huard
|KO (punch)
|TCF: Rumble at Ranch 2
|
|align=center|1
|align=center|2:34
|Phoenix, Arizona, United States
|
|-
|Win
|align=center|3–0
|Michael Parker
|TKO (punches) 
|World Fighting Federation 7
|
|align=center|1
|align=center|3:08
|Tucson, Arizona, United States
|
|-
|Win
|align=center|2–0
|Ruben Gonzales
|Decision (unanimous)
|TCF: Rumble at Ranch 1
|
|align=center|3
|align=center|5:00
|Phoenix, Arizona, United States
|
|-
|Win
|align=center|1–0
|Kenneth Mendoza
|TKO (punches)
|World Fighting Federarion 1
|
|align=center|1
|align=center|4:26
|Tucson, Arizona, United States
|
|-

See also
 List of current UFC fighters
 List of male mixed martial artists

References

External links
 

1980 births
Living people
American male mixed martial artists
Bantamweight mixed martial artists
Featherweight mixed martial artists
Mixed martial artists utilizing collegiate wrestling
Mixed martial artists utilizing Brazilian jiu-jitsu
American mixed martial artists of Mexican descent
Sportspeople from Phoenix, Arizona
Mixed martial artists from Arizona
Ultimate Fighting Championship male fighters
American practitioners of Brazilian jiu-jitsu